Pepper's Ghost is the sixth studio album by the English progressive rock band Arena. It was issued in 2005 by Inside Out Music.

The album tells the story of five heroes in 19th century London, who fight crime and, ultimately, defeat a demon. They are an exorcist, a ninja, a scientist who travels through time, a count and a cowboy with Indian ways. The story is told in the booklet that accompanies it, through a small comic.

Tracks 
All songs written by Clive Nolan, John Mitchell and Mick Pointer, except where noted. All lyrics written by Nolan.

 "Bedlam Fayre" – 6:08
 "Smoke and Mirrors" – 4:42
 "The Shattered Room" – 9:48
 "The Eyes of Lara Moon" – 4:30
 "Tantalus" – 6:51
 "Purgatory Road" – 7:25
 "Opera Fanatica" (Nolan) – 13:06

Personnel 
 Clive Nolan – keyboards, backing vocals
 Mick Pointer – drums
 Rob Sowden – vocals
 John Mitchell – guitar, backing vocals
 Ian Salmon – bass, acoustic guitar

References

External links 
 Verglas' site
 Arena's site
 
 

2005 albums
Arena (band) albums